The Read car was manufactured by the Read Motor Company in Detroit, Michigan from 1913 to 1914.

History 
Ray J. Read, Joseph Beatty and Roy Herald established the Read Motor Company for the manufacture of a four-cylinder 20-hp touring car on a 115-inch wheelbase.  Designated the Model X, the Read had a gray body with white striping and was priced at $850, .

Company offices and showrooms were at 541 Woodward Avenue, with the factory at 68 Champlain Street.  In December of 1913 the company was petitioned into bankruptcy and production ceased in 1914.

References

Defunct motor vehicle manufacturers of the United States
Motor vehicle manufacturers based in Michigan
Defunct manufacturing companies based in Michigan
Vehicle manufacturing companies established in 1913
Vehicle manufacturing companies disestablished in 1914
Brass Era vehicles
1910s cars
Cars introduced in 1913